Ivanjševci ob Ščavnici (in older sources Ivanjšovci) is a small village in the valley of the upper course of the Ščavnica River in the Municipality of Gornja Radgona in northeastern Slovenia.

Name
The name of the settlement was changed from Ivanjševci to Ivanjševci ob Ščavnici in 1955.

References

External links
Ivanjševci ob Ščavnici on Geopedia
Ivanjševci ob Ščavnici local community site

Populated places in the Municipality of Gornja Radgona